1936 was the 43rd season of County Championship cricket in England. Derbyshire won the championship for the first time. India were on tour and England won the Test series 2–0.

Honours
County Championship – Derbyshire
Minor Counties Championship – Hertfordshire
Wisden – Charles Barnett, Bill Copson, Alf Gover, Vijay Merchant, Stan Worthington

Test series

India tour

England defeated India 2–0 with one match drawn.

County Championship

Leading batsmen
Wally Hammond topped the averages with 2107 runs @ 56.94

Leading bowlers
Harold Larwood topped the averages with 119 wickets @ 12.97

References

Annual reviews
 Wisden Cricketers' Almanack 1937

External links
 CricketArchive – season summary

1936 in English cricket
English cricket seasons in the 20th century